St. James's Place plc, formerly St. James's Place Capital plc, is a British investment management company. The head office is in Cirencester, in Gloucestershire, and there are over twenty other offices in the United Kingdom. It is a combined adviser, fund manager and life insurance business. It is listed on the London Stock Exchange and is a constituent of the FTSE 100 Index. It is the largest company of its kind in the UK; In 2021 it had £135 billion in funds under management.

History 

The business has its origins in an entity founded by Mark Weinberg and Mike Wilson in 1991. It secured the financial backing of Jacob Rothschild and became known as J. Rothschild Assurance.

In 1997 J. Rothschild Assurance merged with – and took on the name of – a much smaller entity, St. James's Place Capital.

The business was restructured and transferred to a new legal entity in 2000, when Halifax plc (formerly the Halifax Building Society) took a 60 per cent shareholding for £760 million.

In 2001 Halifax merged with the Bank of Scotland to form HBOS, which in 2009 was bought by the Lloyds Banking Group, which thus acquired a majority holding in St. James's Place Capital. In March 2013 Lloyds sold 20% of its holding to institutional investors, and in December that year sold its remaining holding by private placement for £670m.

In July 2017 an investigation by Which? accused St James's Place of misleading customers on charges. Tom Wilson, author of the article, writes, "There are legitimate reasons why costs might vary – SJP's recommended funds have different charges, so the actual fees will depend on which funds you end up with." The findings of the investigation were sent to the Financial Conduct Authority. The firm continues to have permission to provide regulated products and services.

In July 2019, the Financial Ombudsman Service raised "serious concerns", after a client had been persuaded to transfer more than £60,000 to the company, over claims that St. James's Place had "doctored" documents with "forged" signatures to hide the advice allegedly given by the company to the client.

In November 2019 fourteen former footballers sued St James's Place for £15m, alleging that they had received poor advice concerning tax avoidance regarding film and overseas property investment schemes. A spokesperson for St James's Place said, "the partner who pointed the investors toward the plan did not have its authorisation to do so, and that St James's didn't approve of the proposal". The spokesperson also said, "the partner had retired by the time many of the investments were made, and that others were placed through a self-invested personal pension by a third party". According to a court filing, the claim is worth £15 million (€17.5 million). However, St James's said that the statute of limitations on the claims had expired because the investments had been made more than 10 years before.

Acquisitions

In 2014 the company bought Henley Group, a financial advisor with offices in Hong Kong, Singapore and Shanghai, and renamed it St. James's Place Asia. It bought Rowan Dartington, a discretionary fund manager, for £34.2m in 2015, and Technical Connection, a financial consultancy, in 2016.

People 
In January 2018 Andrew Croft replaced David Bellamy as chief executive, after thirteen years as chief financial officer.

Paul Manduca replaced Iain Cornish as chairman of the firm after the annual general meeting in May 2021.

References

External links

Companies based in Gloucestershire
Financial services companies established in 1991
Companies listed on the London Stock Exchange
1991 establishments in the United Kingdom